Banmankhi is a town in Purnia district of Bihar state, India. It is the biggest assembly constituency in the district.

Geography
Banmankhi is located at an elevation of 37 m above mean sea level.

The town was famous for its sugar mills in the past but now it is most famous for cattle, where nearly 1,000 such as buffalo, cow, goat and many pet animals are for sale. Places of tourist interest include Prahalad Khamba (an ancient history about why Indians celebrate Holi festivals,) Maharshi Mehi asharam (including the birthplace and Meditation Ashram) and Kajha Kothi, Kali Bari Mandir, Railway Matha Asthan. This place is known for its festival in holi time.

Location
Banmankhi is located  34 KM from the District Headquarter Purnia. NH 231 passes through Banmankhi. The railway access point is Banmankhi Junction Railway Station.There are daily trains to Purnia, Saharsa, Bihariganj, Patna, Gaya, and Ranchi. The nearest airports are Patna Airport, Darbhanga Airport and Bagdogra Airport located at 162 KM, 324 KM and 193 KM away respectively. Purnea Airport (ICAO: VEPU) is located 32 KM from Banmankhi.

See also
Chandpur Bhangaha

References

External links
 
 
 About Banmankhi
 Satellite map of Banmankhi

Cities and towns in Purnia district